An apple martini (appletini for short) is a cocktail containing vodka and one or more of apple juice, apple cider, apple liqueur, or apple brandy.

It is not a true martini, but is one of many  drinks that incorporate the term martini into their names. 

This drink, originally called an Adam's Apple Martini because the bartender who created it was named Adam, was created in 1996 at Lola's West Hollywood restaurant.

The drink Adam's Apple was advertised by Smirnoff in the July 1972 issue of Playboy on the inside front cover. The recipe called for an ounce or so of Smirnoff added to apple juice in a tall glass of ice.

Recipe
In its purest form, it would contain:

4 cl ( oz) top shelf vodka (or gin)
2 cl ( oz) apple juice, cider or, most often, apple pucker

Typically, the ingredients are shaken or stirred and then strained into a cocktail glass.

Variations
A sweet and sour mix can also be added before shaking.

Optionally, vermouth may be included, as in a regular martini. 

A common variation of the appletini is the "Rumpletini," with a light rum in place of the vodka.

A similar cocktail can be made with Martini Bianco white vermouth and apple juice in a long drink glass filled with ice.

In popular culture
 Some believe this drink, the "apple martini," could not have been invented in 1996 as claimed above because it is mentioned as the drink served to Jeff Bailey/Markham in Jacques Tourneur 1947 classic noir Out of the Past, however the belief is due to an error in a subtitle, where the line "have a Martini" was misprinted as "apple martini."
 The appletini, which he invariably stipulates should be "easy on the tini," is the favorite alcoholic drink of John "J.D." Dorian in the sitcom Scrubs in which it is often characterized as being somewhat effeminate.
 Along with a rum and diet coke, it is also the favorite drink of Alan Harper from Two and a Half Men. Also in the series, Jerome Burnett asks Charlie Harper for an Appletini.
 In the 2007 Disney film Enchanted, Giselle is offered an appletini, not knowing it's poisoned. Robert's warning is to be wary but as she tries to sip, Pip knocks the drink out of her hands. 
 In the 2010 film The Social Network, during the initial meeting between Facebook co-founders Mark Zuckerberg and Eduardo Saverin and Napster co-founder Sean Parker, Parker asks Saverin's girlfriend what she would prefer to drink, and after she says an appletini, Parker buys the table a few rounds of the drink. In real life, Zuckerberg never had an appletini until he attended the film's premiere. After seeing the film, Zuckerberg made the Appletini Facebook's official drink.
 In the US TV series Modern Family, Claire (Julie Bowen) is seen ordering an Appletini.
 In the 2017 film Molly's Game two mobsters meet Molly in the Four Seasons hotel and John G orders an Appletini to show that he can handle himself among the Manhattan elite.
 In the US television series Community, the main character Jeff buys his friend Annie Edison an Appletini as an apology. 
 In the US television series Impractical Jokers one prank set in a bowling alley includes Joe approaching a group of men and offering to buy them a round of Appletinis.
 In the US television series Mr. Robot, Elliot meets with Mr. Robot at a bar and proceeds to order an Appletini.
In the US television series How I Met Your Mother, Ted Mosby orders an Appletini upon informing Robin's boyfriend he is not gay.
 In the US TV series Lucifer, Eve's favourite drink is an Appletini.

See also

 Martini
 List of cocktails

References

External links
Typical list of apple Martini recipes/ingredients 
Appletini Recipe from site NextCocktail.com

Cocktails with triple sec or curaçao
Cocktails with vodka